The Occidental Observer is an American far-right online publication that covers politics and society from a white nationalist and antisemitic perspective. It is run by the Charles Martel Society. Kevin B. MacDonald, a retired American professor of evolutionary psychology, is its editor. It is an offshoot of The Occidental Quarterly.

Racist and anti-Semitic content

The Anti-Defamation League says that The Occidental Observer "has become a primary voice for anti-Semitism from far-right intellectuals." Among the articles it cites as evidence for this are a September 24, 2008 article titled "The Sandra Bernhard Monstrosity" which charged that "hostility to whites and to Christianity is a mainstream Jewish phenomenon", and a September 12, 2008 article titled "The Washington Posts Willing Executioner?" which, according to the ADL, "argued that that Jews want to exterminate American whites."

A 2015 article in The New York Times examining the use of websites by white supremacists said that "Several organizations — the National Policy Institute, American Renaissance, the Charles Martel Society and its website The Occidental Observer — try to take a more highbrow approach, couching white nationalist arguments as academic commentary on black inferiority, the immigration threat to whites and other racial issues." 

The Occidental Observer's mission statement says it presents "original content touching on the themes of white identity, white interests, and the culture of the West" and that it was founded to promote the perspective of white people as an ethnic group. Its editor, MacDonald, is known for asserting that "Jews engage in an evolutionary strategy that enhances their ability to outcompete others for resources." He has also regularly argued that Jews "are a hostile elite in American society" who seek to undermine "traditional European roots of American society by fostering measures that have led to increased nonwhite immigration into the United States."

The website has praised the Spartans' ideals of racial superiority and eugenics. The publication also posts transphobic content.

Contributors

See also
 American Renaissance

References

American conservative websites
Alt-right websites
Antisemitism in the United States
Cultural magazines published in the United States
2007 establishments in the United States
Publications established in 2007
Internet properties established in 2007
Antisemitic publications